Walter George Cross (born December 9, 1932) is a Canadian politician. He represented the electoral district of  Bonavista North in the Newfoundland and Labrador House of Assembly from 1975 to 1979 and 1982 to 1985. He was a member of the Progressive Conservative Party of Newfoundland and Labrador.

The son of Ernest Cross and Sophie Pelley, he was born in Hermit Cove, Newfoundland and was educated in Badger's Quay and at Memorial University. In 1956, he married Joan Christine Fowlow.

He was elected to the Newfoundland assembly in 1975; the results of the election were declared invalid but Cross won the by-election which followed. He was defeated by Liberal Len Stirling in the 1979 general election. Cross was elected again in 1982 but was defeated when he ran for reelection in 1985.

His son Eli later represented Bonavista North in the assembly.

References

1932 births
Living people
Progressive Conservative Party of Newfoundland and Labrador MHAs
Memorial University of Newfoundland alumni